Araz Dilağarda (also, Araz Dilagarda, Delagardy, and Dilagarda) is a village and municipality in the Fuzuli District of Azerbaijan. It has a population of 2,851.

References 

Populated places in Fuzuli District